Azorella atacamensis is a species of flowering plant in the genus Azorella found in Argentina and Chile.

References

External links
 Azorella atacamensis.

fuegiana
Flora of Argentina
Flora of Chile